Yolande Berbers is a Belgian computer scientist whose interests include software engineering, middleware, distributed systems, ubiquitous computing, model-driven architecture, and context awareness. She is a professor of computer science at KU Leuven, vice-dean of the KU Leuven Faculty of Engineering, and president of the Leuven Center on Information and Communication Technology.

Berbers became a member of the Royal Flemish Academy of Belgium for Science and the Arts in 2014. She was elected president of the European Society for Engineering Education (SEFI) in 2019.

References

External links

Year of birth missing (living people)
Living people
Belgian computer scientists
Belgian women computer scientists
Academic staff of KU Leuven